Gymnastics Society Sibiu was a German sport club based in Sibiu. At that time the city was part of Austria-Hungary and after part of Romania.

History
The Sibiu Gymnastics Club was founded on 30 October 1862 and aimed at youth education. With a decree of 1865, school gymnastics was a compulsory subject, so that the Gymnastics Society Sibiu initially functioned almost exclusively as an academic club from that date. From about 1870 the fencing operations began and in 1891 the Gymnastics Society of Sibiu changed the named in Sibiu Men Turnverein (in German). From 1890 Turnfeste were organized regularly, their general interest led to the creation of a women's team in the girls' gymnastics in September 1896.

In 1897, they return to the name of Hermannstädter Turnverein (in German).

In 1903 first tennis matches was carried out by the Gymnastics Society Sibiu. Until the outbreak of World War I was a lively turning operation, which could then be resumed only in January 1919.

In the spring of 1919 the first football matches were held in Sibiu.

They played four seasons in Romanian Football Final Championship, and the best performance is playing the final in 1930–31. They lost the final against UD Reșița.

The football team disbanded after World War II.

Divizia A

Performances
 Divizia A Runners-up (1): 1930–31
 Divizia B (1): 1934–35

References

Literature

External links
 Romaniansoccer.ro
 Siebenbuerger.de

Category

Association football clubs disestablished in 1945
Liga I clubs
Liga II clubs
Association football clubs established in 1919
Defunct football clubs in Romania
Football clubs in Sibiu County
Sibiu
1919 establishments in Romania